Kazakhstan Tennis Federation (KTF) (Qazaqstan tennıs federatsııasy) is the governing body for professional and amateur tennis in Kazakhstan. Kazakhstan Tennis Federation operates all of the Kazakhstani national representative tennis sides, including the Kazakhstan Davis Cup team, the Kazakhstan Fed Cup team and youth sides as well. KTF is also responsible for organizing and hosting tennis tournaments within Kazakhstan and scheduling the home international fixtures.

Main projects – children tennis development in Kazakhstan, Team Kazakhstan, tennis development in regions, certification program for coaches in Kazakhstan, tournaments, training program for referees, tennis development among amateurs. Bulat Utemuratov is a President of Tennis Federation of Kazakhstan since 2007. Head office is located in Nur-Sultan, capital of Kazakhstan. Out of 14 regions in Kazakhstan, Federation has 12 branches, not counting two main cities Nur-Sultan and Almaty.

Team Kazakhstan
The project called the Team Kazakhstan was founded by the President of Tennis Federation of Kazakhstan Bulat Utemuratov on June 1, 2008.

This project was aimed at training prospective tennis players in Kazakhstan to increase their skills. The main aim of the academy is to train prospective players of national teams for the Davis Cup and the Fed Cup tournaments. The project implies the tennis academy providing players with all conditions including participating in tournaments on the international and republican scale, training by world top specialists, educating, accommodation and meals costs, medical care and social adaptation. Education is not pushed to the sidelines in process of training as it is essential part for making up of full-fledged human personality.

Performance table

References

1992 establishments in Kazakhstan
Organizations based in Astana
Sports organizations established in 1992
Tennis
Tennis in Kazakhstan
National members of the Asian Tennis Federation